The Philadelphia Phillies are a Major League Baseball team based in Philadelphia, Pennsylvania. They  are a member of the Eastern Division of Major League Baseball's National League. The team has played officially under two names since beginning play in 1883: the current moniker, as well as the "Quakers", which was used in conjunction with "Phillies" during the team's early history. The team was also known unofficially as the "Blue Jays" during the World War II era. Since the franchise's inception,  players have made an appearance in a competitive game for the team, whether as an offensive player (batting and baserunning) or a defensive player (fielding, pitching, or both).

Of those  Phillies, 88 have had surnames beginning with the letter P, and 5 beginning with the letter Q. One member of this list has been inducted into the Baseball Hall of Fame; Tony Pérez played for the Phillies during the 1983 season after 18 seasons with 3 other teams. No members of this list have been elected to the Philadelphia Baseball Wall of Fame, nor do they hold any franchise records.

Among the 45 batters in this list, three players share a perfect 1.000 batting average, each in one career at-bat with Philadelphia: first baseman Mike Pasquella, catcher Bill Peterman, and right fielder Ty Pickup. Other players with an average above .300 include Hunter Pence (.324 through 2011), Alex Pitko (.316 in one season), Walter Plock (.400 in one season), and Les Powers (.346 in one season). Plácido Polanco leads all members of this list with 49 home runs, and Dode Paskert's 291 runs batted in (RBI) are best. Of the batters whose surnames begin with Q, Tom Quinlan leads in average (.200), home runs (1), and RBI (3).

Of this list's 43 pitchers, two share 1–0 win–loss records, best in terms of winning percentage; Donn Pall and Clarence Pickrel each won their only decisions as members of the Phillies. Wiley Piatt leads all members of this list with 56 victories, and Ike Pearson's 47 defeats are the most in that statistical category. Robert Person leads this list's pitchers with 535 strikeouts, and infielder Tomás Pérez shares the best earned run average (ERA) with two pitchers—Horacio Piña and Al Porto; all have a 0.00 ERA in their Phillies careers. Among the pitchers whose surnames start with Q, Paul Quantrill leads in winning percentage (.481; a 13–14 record), ERA (4.86), and strikeouts (116).

Footnotes
Key
 The National Baseball Hall of Fame and Museum determines which cap a player wears on their plaque, signifying "the team with which he made his most indelible mark". The Hall of Fame considers the player's wishes in making their decision, but the Hall makes the final decision as "it is important that the logo be emblematic of the historical accomplishments of that player’s career".
 Players are listed at a position if they appeared in 30% of their games or more during their Phillies career, as defined by Baseball-Reference. Additional positions may be shown on the Baseball-Reference website by following each player's citation.
 Franchise batting and pitching leaders are drawn from Baseball-Reference. A total of 1,500 plate appearances are needed to qualify for batting records, and 500 innings pitched or 50 decisions are required to qualify for pitching records.
 Statistics are correct as of the end of the 2010 Major League Baseball season.

References
General

Inline citations

PQ